Jacques Bravo (29 December 1943 – 18 December 2019) was a French politician who was a member of the Socialist Party.

Biography
After he graduated from ENSAE ParisTech in 1968, Bravo worked for the Minister of National Education.

He began his political career in 1983 at the Ministry of the Economy and Finance before being appointed as Financial Director at the Ministry of Higher Education and Research along with Laurent Fabius and Hubert Curien. A member of the Socialist Party, he ran for the 9th arrondissement of Paris in the 1983 French municipal elections, which he lost. He was beaten again in 1989 and 1995. He was on the board of directors at ESPCI Paris and was present when Pierre-Gilles de Gennes and Georges Charpak won the Nobel Prize in Physics. In 1993, he was named Inspector General of Education in Limousin.

Bravo was finally victorious in the 9th arrondissement in 2001. He secured 52% of the vote in the second round, defeating Pierre Lellouche, and became President of the Finance Commission. In 2008, he was re-elected with 63% of the vote.

In 2004, Bravo he was involved in a protest against the extradition of far-right Italian terrorist Cesare Battisti. With the singer Lio and the writer Fred Vargas, he formed a committee against far-right terrorism. He reported weekly on the judicial review of Battisti's murders. In 2019, Battisti admitted to committing two murders and sponsoring two others.

In 2013, Bravo was awarded in the Legion of Honour as Commander.

In the 2014 French municipal elections, Bravo would not stand for re-election. The Socialist Party candidate, Pauline Véron, lost to Delphine Bürkli.

Jacques Bravo died on 18 December 2019 at the age of 75, just 11 days before his 76th birthday.

References

1943 births
2019 deaths
Politicians from Paris
People from Manche
Socialist Party (France) politicians
Commandeurs of the Légion d'honneur
French people of Spanish descent